Yaghob Eissa (Arabic:يعقوب عيسى) (born 23 February 1998) is a Qatari footballer who plays as a forward.

Career
Yaghob Eissa started his career at Al-Arabi and is a product of the Al-Arabi's youth system. On 14 October 2017, Yaghob Eissa made his professional debut for Al-Arabi against Umm Salal in the Pro League, replacing Mohammed Salem .

External links

References

1998 births
Living people
Qatari footballers
Al-Arabi SC (Qatar) players
Lusail SC players
Qatar Stars League players
Qatari Second Division players
Association football forwards
Place of birth missing (living people)